Past Imperfect: Facts, Fictions, and Fraud — American history from Bancroft and Parkman to Ambrose, Bellesiles, Ellis, and Goodwin is a 2004 non-fiction book, written by Peter Charles Hoffer, that covers the historiography  of U.S. History in Part 1 and the controversies surrounding Stephen Ambrose, Michael Bellesiles, Joseph Ellis, and Doris Kearns Goodwin in Part 2. A second edition was released on July 3, 2007 in which the book was "revised and updated [and] edited with a new final chapter and conclusion."

Reviews 

 The American Archivist
 Journalism History
 Pacific Historical Review
 The Public Historian
 The Washington Post
 The Wilson Quarterly

References

Further reading

Review Dennison, George M. President and Professor of History. UM-Missoula. The Montana Professor 16.2, Spring 2006. .
Price, Mathew. "Hollow History". (October 24, 2004) The Boston Globe.

External links

C-SPAN

2004 non-fiction books
American non-fiction books
Books about historiography
American history books
Philosophy of history
Historiography of the United States
History books about the United States